The Springfield Celts Rugby Club is a Division III rugby union team based in Springfield, Illinois, United States and is currently in the Illinois Union.

History
The Springfield Celts Rugby Club was established in 1975. Over the years the Celts have created a tradition of hard hitting rugby often taking the best of teams out of their game plan. This tradition has produced several tournament trophies and union victories. The legend of the "Green Jersey" has haunted the Midwestern region for many years. The young players hear of the stories of destruction and victory and continue to wear the Green Jersey with pride.

Sponsorship
The Springfield Celts Rugby Club's sponsors are Liquid Rugby in Petersburg, Illinois. All socials after home matches will be at Guitars and Cadillacs in Springfield, Illinois.

References
 Sias, Holly, "Want to have a ball? Try Rugby", The State Journal-Register, September 23, 2008, Page 12.
 Murphy, Michael, "RUGGED RUGBY A GAME FOR 'THE FEW, THE PROUD, THE INSANE'", The State Journal-Register, Oct. 14, 1985, Page 7.
 Otis, Kevin C.,"Springfield Celts Sponsor Youth Academy", rugbyrugby.com, Retrieved 8-31-2009
 Robert, Amanda, "Springfield Celts looking for new young ruggers", Illinois Times, September 17–23, 2009, Vol. 35, No. 6, Page 9.
 Beck, Molly, "Springfield Celts hope the future of rugby lies with high schoolers", The State Journal-Register, May 28, 2010, Page 18-19.

External links
Springfield Celts Rugby Club
Springfield Celts Rugby Club MySpace Page

Rugby union teams in Illinois
Celts
Rugby clubs established in 1975
1975 establishments in Illinois